The Barcelona Pavilion (aka Barcelona Pavilion) was an indie pop band  from Toronto, Ontario, known for their lively dance-friendly music.

History
Barcelona Pavilion formed in 2001 and, in 2002, independently released a two-track CDr, titled The Barcelona Pavilion. They were then signed to Meccico Records and, in 2002, Blocks Recording Club released the EP It's The Barcelona Pavilion!. Some of its five songs received airplay on local radio in 2003, In 2005, they released the four track mini-disk It's Because of the Barcelona Pavilion.

The band were described by NOW in 2003 as "the best new band in Toronto", and were strongly associated with the Torontopia scene of the era.  That year they also recorded a radio session for BBC Radio 1 DJ John Peel. 

After disbanding in 2005, the group reunited for a one-off performance as a part of the popular Toronto music series Wavelength's 500th showcase on February 14, 2010.

Discography
The Barcelona Pavilion (Blocks, 2001)
It's the Barcelona Pavilion (Blocks, 2003)
It's Because of the Barcelona Pavilion (Blocks, 2005)

Compilations
Toronto Is The Best!!! Toronto Is Great!!! (Blocks, 2004)
Colours Are Brighter (Rough Trade, 2006)

See also

Canadian rock
List of bands from Canada
List of Canadian musicians
:Category:Canadian musical groups

References

Musical groups established in 2001
Musical groups disestablished in 2005
Canadian indie pop groups
Musical groups from Toronto
2001 establishments in Ontario
2005 disestablishments in Ontario